The American Regions Mathematics League (ARML), is an annual, national high school mathematics team competition held simultaneously at four locations in the United States: the University of Iowa, Penn State, University of Nevada, Reno, and the University of Alabama in Huntsville.  Past sites have included San Jose State University, Rutgers University, UNLV, Duke University, and University of Georgia.

Teams consist of 15 members, which usually represent a large geographic region (such as a state) or a large population center (such as a major city).  Some schools also field teams.  The competition is held in June, on the first Saturday after Memorial Day.

In 2022, 120 teams competed with about 1800 students.

ARML problems cover a wide variety of mathematical topics including algebra, geometry, number theory, combinatorics, probability, and inequalities. Calculus is not required to successfully complete any problem, but it may facilitate solving the problem more quickly or efficiently.  While part of the competition is short-answer based, there is a cooperative team round, and a proof-based power question (also completed as a team).  ARML problems are harder than most high school mathematics competitions.

The contest is sponsored by D. E. Shaw & Co.. Contest supporters are the American Mathematical Society, Mu Alpha Theta (the National Mathematics Honor Society for High School and Two-Year College students), Star League, Penguin Books, and Princeton University Press.

Competition format
The competition consists of four formal events:
 A team round, where the entire team has 20 minutes to solve 10 problems. Each problem is worth 5 points, for a possible total of 50 points
 A power question, where the entire team has one hour to solve a multiple-part (usually ten) question requiring explanations and proofs.  This is usually an unusual, unique, or invented topic so students are forced to deal with complex new mathematical ideas. Each problem is weighted for a possible 50 points.
 An individual round, where each team member answers five groups of two questions each, with ten minutes per pair.  Starting in 2009, the individual round expanded from eight questions to ten. Each problem is worth 1 point, for a grand total of 150 points possible for the team. Only 12 students nationwide received a perfect score in 2014. This round's format is similar to that of the Target Round in MATHCOUNTS.
 A relay, where the team is broken into five groups of three.  Within each group, the first team member solves a problem and passes the solution to the next team member, who plugs that answer into their question, and so on.  The allotted time is six minutes, but extra points are given for solving the problem in three minutes. Solving the relay in 3 minutes gives 5 points, solving it in 6 minutes gives 3 points. The whole process is done twice, making the maximum 50 points possible for the team.
 The teams are scored based on the number of points they attained with the maximum being 300 points. Team score ties are broken by first considering the sum of the Team and Power Rounds, then the Relay Round total.

At the end, there is a set of tiebreaker questions to determine the top 20 participants, who receive cash prizes from D. E. Shaw & Co. Each student tied for the highest score (or the highest two scores if there are fewer than 20 tied with the top score) is given up to three tiebreaker questions, one at a time, with the goal of answering correctly as quickly as possible. As soon as a student answers a tiebreaker question correctly, they have finished the tiebreaker. Students are then ranked by individual round score, followed by the time to answer the first tiebreaker question correctly, then the time to answer the second tiebreaker (if applicable), then the third. Students are given 10 minutes to answer the first tiebreaker question, and 6 minutes to answer each of the second and third tiebreaker questions.

In recent years, there has been a super relay, where two groups of seven team members (fourteen in all) both work to give a correct answer to the fifteenth team member.  That last team member substitutes two answers into his problem.  For logistical reasons, the Super Relay has never counted towards the team score.  It was instituted as a "filler" while scores are tabulated. Candies and other goodies are sometimes rewards for the super relay round.

Also in recent years, a song contest has become an informal event at ARML.  Each school is allowed to have any number of their students perform a song related to mathematics, usually a parody of a popular song, with its lyrics replaced.

The format of the ARML competition is based on the NYSML competition, but is generally considered more difficult than the NYSML competition.  This format also inspired the Great Plains Math League.

History
The New York State Mathematics League held its first competition in 1973, a competition intended for New York state teams.  A team from Massachusetts asked to participate in the 1974 NYSML competition, and it took first place.  This led to the creation of the Atlantic Regions Mathematics League in 1976, which became the American Regions Mathematics League in 1984.

When the Atlantic Regions Mathematics League was founded, the competition was held at a single eastern site that changed from year to year:

After 1983, the coordinators decided to keep the competition at Penn State University.  ARML expanded to two sites in the late 1980s and to three sites in 1995.  In 2008, ARML added a fourth site at the University of Georgia in Athens to better accommodate students in the Southeast, which moved to the University of Alabama in Huntsville in 2020.

The 2006 competition saw significant expansion of about 25% more participants than ever before.  Attendance at the western site, UNLV, nearly doubled.

Due to the COVID-19 pandemic, the ARML competition was not held in 2020, and it was only held virtually in 2021.

Past team winners

Past individual winners

References

External links
 ARML homepage
 ARML Forum

Mathematics competitions
Recurring events established in 1976